Brezigar is a surname. Notable people with the surname include:

Barbara Brezigar (born 1953), Slovene lawyer and politician
Milko Brezigar (1886–1958), Slovene and Yugoslav liberal economist